Stephen Shellen, also known as Stephen Shellenberger (born June 17, 1957), is a Canadian actor. He is probably best known for his role as Luke Brenner on the TV series Counterstrike, for his role as Neal in Robert Redford's A River Runs Through It, and for his voice acting in the video game Deus Ex: Human Revolution.

Appearances

External links

1957 births
Living people
Male actors from Victoria, British Columbia
Canadian male film actors
Canadian male voice actors
20th-century Canadian male actors
21st-century Canadian male actors